The Broadway Theatre (formerly known as the Lewisham Theatre) is a theatre on Rushey Green, Catford, in the London Borough of Lewisham. A grade II listed building, the theatre was built in 1932 and is an example of Art Deco design. It has two auditoriums, an 800-seat main theatre and a small 80-seat studio theatre. The theatre's programme consists of a diverse mix of theatre and music, including stand up comedy, nostalgia shows, pantomime, drama and children's theatre.

History
The architects of the building were Bradshaw Gass & Hope; the slightly Gothic features were intended to relate to the adjacent Gothic style vestry hall which has since been demolished. The theatre was originally a concert hall, built as part of the town hall extension, which was officially opened by the Duke of York on 22 June 1932. A pipe organ made by John Compton with three manuals was installed at the time the concert hall opened.

Main theatre
The Broadway Theatre is particularly noted for presenting a wide range of black theatre.

Broadway Studio 
The Broadway's Studio Theatre runs a continuous programme of productions featuring professional actors and directors. Since 2001's production of Ben Elton's Popcorn the studio has hosted numerous productions including Cabaret, Trainspotting, A Clockwork Orange and their critically acclaimed take on Frank McGuinness's Someone Who'll Watch Over Me.

References

External links

 Broadway Theatre, London, Website

Theatres in the London Borough of Lewisham
Grade II listed buildings in the London Borough of Lewisham
Grade II listed theatres
Art Deco architecture in London
Catford
Buildings and structures completed in 1932
Bradshaw, Gass & Hope buildings